The Caldas 2G7 Vento is a Colombian ultralight aircraft that was designed and produced by Caldas Aeronautica of Cali, introduced in about 2010. The company seems to be out of business and the aircraft production completed.

Design and development
The aircraft features a strut-braced high-wing, an enclosed cabin with two-seats-in-tandem accessed by flip-up doors, fixed tricycle landing gear and a single engine in tractor configuration.

The aircraft was designed for recreational, flight training and agricultural aircraft uses. The standard engine fitted is the  Rotax 912UL powerplant.

Specifications (2G7 Vento)

References

External links
Official website archives on Archive.org

Vento
2010s Colombian ultralight aircraft
Homebuilt aircraft
Light-sport aircraft
Single-engined tractor aircraft